Irina Yuryevna Dzyuba (born 16 December 1980 in Novosibirsk) is a Russian former rhythmic gymnast. She won bronze in the group competition at the 1996 Summer Olympics in Atlanta.

External links 
 

1980 births
Living people
Russian rhythmic gymnasts
Gymnasts at the 1996 Summer Olympics
Olympic gymnasts of Russia
Olympic bronze medalists for Russia
Olympic medalists in gymnastics
Sportspeople from Volgograd

Medalists at the 1996 Summer Olympics